The 2012 WDF Europe Cup was the 18th edition of the WDF Europe Cup darts tournament, organised by the World Darts Federation. It was held in Kemer, Turkey from 31 October to 3 November 2012.



Entered teams
31 countries/associations entered a men's selection in the event.

28 countries/associations entered a women's selection in the event.

Men's singles

Men's pairs

Men's team
Round Robin

Group A

 95 
 93 
 93 

Group B

 96 
 91 
 95 
 91 
 93 
 93 

Group C

 91 
 93 
 91 
 98 
 97 
 00 

Group D

 98 
 92 
 92 
 97 
 94 
 95 

Group E

 95 
 93 
 92 
 94 
 95 
 97 

Group F

 97 
 92 
 91 
 95 
 93 
 98 

Group G

 97 
 91 
 90 
 96 
 91 
 95 

Group H

 94 
 90 
 93 

Knock Out

Women's singles

Women's pairs
Round Robin

Group A

 Jeannette Stoop & Colette Rudin 41  Julie Gore & Rhian Edwards
 Julie Gore & Rhian Edwards 41  Radana Jandova & Iveta Bruska
 Radana Jandova & Iveta Bruska 42  Jeannette Stoop & Colette Rudin

Group B

 Susanna Young & Louise Hepburn 40  Sanja Andjelkovic & Djurdjina Miscevic
 Susanna Young & Louise Hepburn 42  Paula Smith & Christine Hunt
 Susanna Young & Louise Hepburn 40  Erika Bagdonaviciene & Renata Vaikutiene
 Sanja Andjelkovic & Djurdjina Miscevic 43  Paula Smith & Christine Hunt
 Sanja Andjelkovic & Djurdjina Miscevic 40  Erika Bagdonaviciene & Renata Vaikutiene
 Paula Smith & Christine Hunt 43  Erika Bagdonaviciene & Renata Vaikutiene

Group C

 Tamara Schuur & Karin Krappen 42  Janni Larsen & Charlotte Pedersen
 Tamara Schuur & Karin Krappen 40  Karin Jahn & Petra Hristovski
 Janni Larsen & Charlotte Pedersen 40  Karin Jahn & Petra Hristovski

Group D

 Grace Crane & Nicole Dillon 43  Patricia De Peuter & Joyce Janssens
 Grace Crane & Nicole Dillon 40  Oana-Diana Birsan & Oana Nutu
 Patricia De Peuter & Joyce Janssens 40  Oana-Diana Birsan & Oana Nutu 

Group E

 Trina Gulliver & Deta Hedman 41  Barbara Osti & Giada Ciofi
 Trina Gulliver & Deta Hedman 40  Cagla-Pinar Utkutug & Sedra Uzunca
 Barbara Osti & Giada Ciofi 43  Cagla-Pinar Utkutug & Sedra Uzunca

Group F

 Rachna David & Hege Løkken 41  Lumi Silvan & Kirsi Viinikainen
 Rachna David & Hege Løkken 40  Sigridur-Gudrun Jonsdottir & Petrea Fridriksdottir
 Rachna David & Hege Løkken 40  Gustin Blanka & Viktorija Klanecek
 Lumi Silvan & Kirsi Viinikainen 42  Sigridur-Gudrun Jonsdottir & Petrea Fridriksdottir
 Lumi Silvan & Kirsi Viinikainen 40  Gustin Blanka & Viktorija Klanecek
 Sigridur-Gudrun Jonsdottir & Petrea Fridriksdottir 42  Gustin Blanka & Viktorija Klanecek

Group G

 Heike Ernst & Irina Armstrong 40  Kristin Bomander & Maud Jansson
 Heike Ernst & Irina Armstrong 42  Jolanta Rzepka & Aleksandra Grzesik
 Heike Ernst & Irina Armstrong 40  Sandrine Valverde & Laure Schweitzer
 Kristin Bomander & Maud Jansson 41  Jolanta Rzepka & Aleksandra Grzesik
 Kristin Bomander & Maud Jansson 40  Sandrine Valverde & Laure Schweitzer
 Jolanta Rzepka & Aleksandra Grzesik 43  Sandrine Valverde & Laure Schweitzer

Group H

 Caroline Breen & Angela De Ward 41  Iolanda Riba & Laura Damont
 Caroline Breen & Angela De Ward 40  Kunka Ivanova & Anelia Eneva
 Iolanda Riba & Laura Damont 42  Kunka Ivanova & Anelia Eneva

Knock Out

References

Darts tournaments